De Montfort University Leicester (DMU) is a public university in the city of Leicester, England. It was established in accordance with the Further and Higher Education Act in 1992 as a degree awarding body. The name De Montfort University was taken from Simon de Montfort, a 13th-century Earl of Leicester.

De Montfort University has approximately 27,000 full and part-time students, 3,240 staff and an annual turnover in the region of £168 million. The university is organised into four faculties: Art, Design, and Humanities (ADH); Business and Law (BAL); Health and Life Sciences (H&LS); and Computing, Engineering and Media (CEM). It is a Sustainable Development Hub, focusing on Peace, Justice and Strong Institutions, an initiative by the United Nations launched in 2018. The Department of Education awarded university a Gold rating in the 2017 Teaching Excellence Framework. It is a member of the Association of Commonwealth Universities.

History

Origins
The university's origins are in the Leicester School of Art, established in 1870 on a voluntary basis. The school expanded in response to the changing needs of late 19th-century industry; leading to the introduction of subjects such as engineering, building and machine drawing. By 1897, it was clear the buildings being used were no longer suitable. £25,000 was raised to build 'a very handsome school that would be enormous credit to the town and ... so that it would answer its purpose for the next 100 years'. The building in question is the Hawthorn Building, which today still houses the sciences; in the shape of the Faculty of Health and Life Sciences. At the time of the first phase its construction, there were 500 art students and 1,000 technical students. In 1903, a letter from His Majesty's Inspector praised the success of the technical subjects. Increasing demand for courses prompted an extension to the Hawthorn Building in 1909. In 1919, further properties were rented. The Duchess of Atholl laid the foundation stone of Hawthorn's new west wing in 1927; by which time the establishment was known under by the joint name of The Leicester Colleges of Art and Technology.

In 1930, the college was recognised for the external degree course in Pharmacy of the University of London, and the Pharmaceutical Chemist Diploma of the Royal Pharmaceutical Society of Great Britain. In 1934, the University of London recognised the college as suitable for preparing students for the External Degree in Engineering, and so the courses on offer developed apace. The prospectus for 1936–37 included details of various technically based schools, including the Schools of Architecture, Building and Building Crafts, and Engineering. The fourth phase of extensions to the Hawthorn Building was completed in 1938–39. The first accommodation was secured in 1946 when three houses were purchased by the university.

More space was needed to meet the academic demand, and so in 1948, F. Bray, Under Secretary of the Ministry of Education, opened the converted Downings Warehouse. In 1966, the new Fletcher building was opened by The Queen Mother. In the same year, a white paper, "A Plan for Polytechnics and Other Colleges", was published, leading to the creation of the City of Leicester Polytechnic. Under the provision of the Education Reform Act 1988, Leicester Polytechnic became a Higher Education Corporation, with Dame Anne Mueller appointed Chancellor in June 1991.

Leicester Polytechnic became De Montfort University in accordance with the Further and Higher Education Act in 1992, establishing it as a degree-awarding body in its own right.

Name

The name De Montfort University was chosen in allusion to Simon de Montfort, Earl of Leicester, a prominent figure in establishing the Parliament of England in the 13th century. Honouring Simon de Montfort has been controversial, as in 1231 he expelled the Jews from Leicester. By taking his name the university's commitment to community values has been questioned.

Expansion and contraction

In the 1990s the institution aimed to become a multi-campus collegiate university covering the entire East Midlands, and as such, the university swiftly acquired other campuses. Leicester Polytechnic built a new campus in Kents Hill in Milton Keynes, across the road from the Open University – the first brand-new higher education campus built in Britain for twenty years. This took its first students in 1991 and was officially opened by Queen Elizabeth II in 1992, prior to the official foundation of De Montfort University as a New University; it was branded The Polytechnic: Milton Keynes until it became De Montfort University Milton Keynes. Departments at Milton Keynes included Computer and Information Sciences, Built Environment and Business.

In 1994 De Montfort University took over the higher education activities of the Bedford College of Higher Education, while the further education section remained independent under the name Bedford College. The university absorbed the Lincolnshire College of Art in Lincoln, and the Lincolnshire College of Agriculture and Horticulture in Caythorpe, Lincolnshire in 1994; and the Riseholme Agricultural College in Riseholme, Lincolnshire and the Leicester-based Charles Frears College of Nursing and Midwifery in 1995.

Since 2000, the university's expansionist policy has been reversed, with all outlying campuses being sold off. The Bedford campus merged with the University of Luton to form the University of Bedfordshire; the campuses in Lincolnshire were transferred to the University of Lincoln; and the Milton Keynes campus was closed in 2003, with its buildings taken over by the Open University. The institution divested itself of its last outlying site, Charles Frears (on London Road in Leicester), in 2011, when the nursing school moved to the city centre campus.

Present day 
The university has approximately 27,000 full and part-time students, 3,240 staff and an annual turnover in the region of £168 million. Its campus comprises ten halls of residence offering around 3,000 university sourced rooms, and is approximately a ten-minute walk from Leicester city centre.

The proceeds from the campus sales have been ploughed back into the Leicester City Campus, which has consequently seen a large amount of development, including the construction of two new buildings and the extensive refurbishment of a third, the Edith Murphy building (formerly Bosworth House) to house the students and staff of the School of Nursing and Midwifery, previously based at Charles Frears.

The Performance Arts Centre for Excellence (PACE), funded by a £4.5 Million grant from the Higher Education Funding Council for England, was opened in 2007 by the BBC's Creative Director Alan Yentob. A new building for the Faculty of Business and Law – the Hugh Aston building –  designed by CPMG Architects opened in September 2009. The new Business and Law centre has the Magazine Square at its centre and cost £35 million.

The University's new £8 million sports facility, named the Queen Elizabeth II Diamond Jubilee Leisure Centre, was opened on campus on 30 July 2012 by Vice-Chancellor, Dominic Shellard.

The former John Sandford Site was renovated to a conference and events centre called 'The Venue@DMU'. This was opened in September 2015.

There is a new Arts and Design building, opened in the centre of the Campus in September 2016, called the Vijay Patel Building, (also by CPMG Architects), which is split into the Arts Tower and the Design Wing. The pedestrianised roads through the campus have also been turned into grassed/paved walkways.

In 2019 Vice Chancellor Dominic Shellard resigned in advance of an Office for Students report which found serious and systematic failures in governance under his leadership.

Campus

The Leicester campus is close to Leicester Castle and occupies what was once a religious precinct of the castle, built by the earls and dukes of Lancaster, known as the Newarke. It is bordered by the 15th-century Magazine Gateway or Newarke Gateway and the campus contains listed buildings, including Trinity House, rebuilt in 1901 and containing part of the original 14th-century Hospital of The Annunciation building. The Hawthorn Building contains the ruins of the 1353 Church of the Annunciation of Our Lady of the Newarke, where the body of King Richard III is said, according to early sources, to have been displayed before his burial at Greyfriars. The ruins form the centrepiece of the De Montfort University Heritage Centre, opened in March 2015. As well as the ruins, the Centre also celebrates the history of the university and contemporary student work.

The campus has seen several recent developments as part of a ten-year £200 million initiative by the university, such as the £35 million Hugh Aston Building; constructed to move students from the Faculty of Business and Law closer to the centre of the university's infrastructure.

In 2016, the Vijay Patel Building was opened. The Vijay Patel Building is home to art and design courses and is the centrepiece of the £136 million Campus Transformation Project which aims to "provide DMU with one of the finest city centre campuses in the country". The building is named after Dr Vijay Patel, who, alongside his wife, made the single largest donation by individuals in the university's history.

Campus Centre

The Campus Centre offers numerous facilities for students. The building was completed in September 2003, fulfilling a number of functions and providing a wide range of services. The building is a three-floor building designed by Ellis Williams Architects, the company responsible for the Baltic Centre for Contemporary Art in Gateshead. It was constructed on the site of the old Stibbe building, at a cost of £8.5 million and is central to the university's 'Masterplan', which seeks to regenerate the Leicester campus environment.
It houses the De Montfort University Students' Union, comprising various societies such as Demon FM a student radio station; Demon TV; and The Demon, a student-run newspaper published fortnightly through term time. It also has a Student Night Club called Injunction with two rooms on the second floor.

The Union operates a lettings agency in a joint venture with the University of Leicester Students Union.  The service which operates from both campuses is known as SULETS.

Library and Learning Services
The four Library sites on campus consist of the main Kimberlin Library and three ancillaries. Many Library functions are also available off campus at any time, including electronic resources such as academic databases, and online account management facilities such as book renewal.

The Kimberlin Library is a four-storey building opened in 1977, extended in 1997 and extensively refurbished in 2007. The ground floor Learning Zone was opened as part of the 2007 refurbishment and provides space for group and individual work. Kimberlin Library has an overall seating capacity of around 1250. The upper floors of the library cater for more traditional Quiet and Silent study needs. Further investment in 2011 saw the opening of the library Archives and Special Collections rooms and a dedicated Research Postgraduate Study Room. There are also facilities including dedicated study rooms for students with disabilities and special needs.

The Eric Wood Learning Zone is in the ground floor of the adjacent Eric Wood Building, was extended and developed into a second Learning Zone, providing 180 more study places. This was opened on 12 January 2009.

The Law Library is situated in the Hugh Aston Building which opened in September 2009, Leicester Law School is one of only a few in the country to have a dedicated Law Library on site within the teaching building . One room within this library houses the separate Legal Practice Course library, to which only students on that course have access.

Organisation and governance

Faculty of Art, Design and Humanities
Created from a merger of the previous Faculty of Art and Design and the Faculty of Humanities, the Faculty of Art, Design and Humanities offers traditional humanities subjects including English and History, as well as more design based courses in areas such as Architecture and Fine Art.

Within its humanities division, the Faculty currently holds five National Teacher Fellows; the latest being Deborah Cartmell, Reader in English, who was made a Fellow in recognition of excellence in teaching and learning support. Cartmell developed the university's pioneering Master's degree in Adaptation Studies and is a founding member of the British Shakespeare Association and the Association of Adaptation Studies.

Subjects of the humanities are taught within the Clephan Building, which was refurbished specifically for the Faculty's use.  The Clephan Building plays host to the Cultural Exchanges event, which features guests and speakers from the arts, media, literature, politics and film. It began in 2000, and attracts upwards of 4,000 visitors annually. Recent visitors to the festival have included the screenwriter and novelist Andrew Davies, famous for his work in the field of adaptation; novelist Adele Parks, a highly acclaimed women's fiction author nominated for the Romantic Novelist of the Year award; and Janet Street-Porter, a British media personality, journalist, television presenter and producer.

Recently, the Faculty has collaborated with two other European universities to offer a new Master's course, based in its International Centre for Sports History and Culture: the MA Management, Law and Humanities of Sport. Organised by Centre International d'Etude du Sport (CIES) and endorsed by FIFA, the course was created to promote management education within the sports world. It is ostensibly recognised as one of the top graduate programmes in sport, The Humanities of Sport module is organised by the International Centre for Sport History and Culture at De Montfort, whilst the Management of Sport module is taught by SDA Bocconi School of Management in Italy and the final Sports Law module by Université de Neuchâtel in Switzerland. Course patrons have included Joseph S. Blatter, Lord Coe, Sir Bobby Charlton and Sergey Bubka. As of 2010, the course has produced more than 200 graduates from over 70 different nations.

The Faculty boasts the only university courses in the world to specialise in lingerie, underwear, body-wear, swimwear and performance sportswear, which first began after the Second World War. The Faculty also offers the only UK university courses in Footwear Design.

Faculty of Business and Law
The Faculty of Business and Law incorporates the Leicester Castle Business School and the Leicester De Montfort Law School. The Faculty has a long history of international partnerships; in 1997, it collaborated to help found a business school in India – the Daly College Business School.

The Leicester Business School was regarded by The Sunday Times as one of the top 10 business schools in the UK, whilst the 2007 National Student Survey ranked it seventh out of 110 institutions for student satisfaction.

It comprises more than 4000 students and 150 academic staff, making it one of the larger providers of business and management education in the UK.

The Faculty of Business and Law is based in the Hugh Aston Building; a £35 million investiture opened in March 2010. The construction of the building released the 14th-century Magazine Gateway from four lanes of traffic, allowing a tree-lined square to be created; the Magazine Square.

The building's namesake, Hugh Aston, died in November 1558 and was a leading figure of his generation; serving at different times as Coroner, Mayor, and Member of Parliament for the borough of Leicester, as well as being one of the foremost early Tudor composers.

Faculty of Health and Life Sciences
The Faculty of Health and Life Science is De Montfort's largest faculty, housing roughly 500 full-time and part-time staff, as well as approximately 8000 students. It is composed of four interconnected schools: Leicester School of Allied Health Sciences, the School of Applied Social Sciences, the Leicester School of Nursing and Midwifery and the Leicester School of Pharmacy.

The Faculty is based in the Hawthorn Building, which was previously an Arts College; boasting an art-deco turnstile and stage area which now functions as a lecture theatre. David Bowie and Jimi Hendrix were reported to have played at the venue in the 1960s. There are ancient archways visible on the lower ground floor; supposedly remnants from a monastery which occupied the site prior to the building's construction.

The four schools interrelate so as to allow collaboration across subject boundaries in teaching, consultancy and research. Between them, the Schools cover not just laboratory sciences but Child, Adolescent and Family Therapy; Community Studies; Community and Criminal Justice; Policing Practice; Criminal Investigation with Policing; Counselling and Psychotherapy; Applied Criminology; Applied Criminology with Psychology; Biomedical Science; Medical Science; Criminology and Criminal Justice; Forensic Science; Health and Wellbeing in Society; Midwifery; Nursing (Adult, Child, Mental Health, Learning Disability); Paramedic Science; Pharmaceutical Sciences; Pharmacy; Psychology; Psychology with Criminology; Psychology with Education Studies; Social Work; and Speech and Language Therapy.

In addition, the Community and Criminal Justice Division in the School of Applied Social Sciences is one of only 3 HEI providers nationally [England and Wales] with regard to the provision of both a Foundation degree and Graduate Diploma [both are work based] in Community and Criminal Justice Degree run in association with the National Offender Management Service.

Computing, Engineering and Media (CEM)
Originally Faculty of Computing Sciences and Engineering, renamed on 1 October 2008. Descended via the former Leicester Polytechnic from the old Leicester College of Technology. It comprises the School of Engineering, the Leicester Media School and the School of Computing.

The main faculty building is the Queens Building, its unique design means that the building has no need for cooling as it controls the temperature through a series of vents.

Governance
The university is governed primarily through its 17 person Board of Governors, which is chaired by Ian Squires since January 2020.

Reputation and rankings

The UK Department of Education awarded the institution a Gold rating in the 2017 Teaching Excellence Framework, describing teaching as being "consistently outstanding" and "of the highest quality found in the UK Higher Education sector". The 2014 Research Excellence Framework described roughly 60% of the University's research activities as "world-leading" or "internationally excellent".

The university has one of the largest numbers of Teacher Fellows of any UK university and was awarded Centre of Excellence status for its performance practice teaching and student support. This award has enabled further investment in research as well as the construction of a new building with performance studios and rehearsal areas.

Further, the University was ranked 94th in the UK for the Guardian rankings of 2018, 70th by The Complete University Guide for 2019, and 67th by The Times/Sunday Times higher education ranking.

In 2019, the first ever Times Higher Education (THE) University Impact Rankings, a global performance tables that assess universities against the United Nations' Sustainable Development Goals, ranked De Montfort University 50th in the world.

Affiliations and partnerships
The university has special arrangements with more than 80 universities and colleges in over 25 countries, including Nanjing University, ranked 120th in the world by the Times Higher Education and situated in Jiangsu, eastern China. The two universities have launched various initiatives, including a scholarship programme for De Montfort students and doctoral study coupled with English language tuition for students from Nanjing. De Montfort's Institute of Creative Technologies will also advise Nanjing University on a digital recreation of medieval China, following the success of the institute in developing a virtual rendition of Leicester during its Roman occupation.

The numerous cultural partnerships that the university holds currently include a link with Leicester City Football Club, utilising the university's expertise in sports history to help make the club's heritage more widely available, as well a partnership with the British Library, which will see the two institutions working together in order to boost research and cultural activities. The university has also collaborated with Leicester in the creation of the Digital Media Centre (DMC) in Leicester city centre, which received £1 million in funding from the university. Through the university's involvement, the DMC will benefit from the latest research in media and related technologies. Students on appropriate courses will have the opportunity to use the production and educational facilities at the Centre. 

The university was a member of the University Alliance group, but left in October 2013.

Notable academics
See also Academics of De Montfort University.

Gavin Bryars, composer
James Stevens Curl, architectural historian, architect and author
Gary Day
Christopher Duffy
Simon Emmerson, composer
Desmond Fernandes
David Greenaway, economist
Ian Hall
Robert Hewison
Christopher Hobbs
Derek Hockridge
John Hoskin
Andrew Hugill
Chris Joseph, writer
Joanna Scanlan, actress
Stephen Thomas Knight
Leigh Landy
Jim Marshall
Nicholas J. Phillips
Kate Pullinger
John Richards, musician
Martin Rieser
Michael Scott
Debbie Sell
Dave Smith, composer
Sue Thomas, author
John Young, composer
Lala Meredith-Vula

Notable alumni

Academics
 Louis de Bernières, novelist
 Michael Scott, is the current Vice-Chancellor of Glyndŵr University in Wrexham, Wales.

Business
 Tony May ISD
 Janette Pallas, former Head of Enterprise Services
 Nicola Pellow, co-designer of the WWW
 Ken Shuttleworth, architect

Fashion
 Nichole de Carle, lingerie designer
 Laura Coleman, model, Miss England 2008
 Liam Fahy, footwear designer
 Karolina Laskowska, lingerie designer
 Janet Reger, lingerie designer
Samuel Ross, fashion designer, founder of A-COLD-WALL*

Health and medicine
 Allen Lloyd, pharmacist and founder of LloydsPharmacy
 Debbie Sell, speech and language pathology therapist
 Vijay Patel, pharmacist and founder of Waymade Plc.

Artists, entertainers and journalists
 John "TotalBiscuit" Bain, game commentator
 John Buckley, sculptor
 Audrey Barker, artist
 Zarina Bhimji, photographer and filmmaker
 Justin Chadwick, actor, television and film director
 JS Clayden, vocalist for Pitchshifter, founder of PSI Records
 Helen Mary Coaton, sculptor
 Marverine Cole, radio and television presenter
 Dorothy Cross, artist and sculptor
 Charles Dance, actor
 Pete Donaldson, broadcaster
 Keeley Donovan, broadcaster
 Alun Evans, journalist, CEO of Football Association of Wales
 Mike Foyle, music producer
 Christian Furr, artist
 MJ Hibbett, singer-songwriter
 Sarah Keyworth, comedian
 Akram Khan, dancer
 Nero, music producer
 Jamie-Lee O'Donnell, actor
 QBoy, rapper and producer
 Simon Rimmer, chef and television presenter
 Nick Ruston, artist and sculptor
 David Shrigley, artist
 Simon Wells, film director

Law
 Michael Beloff QC, barrister
 Geoffrey Bindman QC, human rights lawyer
 John Geoffrey Jones QC, judge, president of the Mental Health Review Tribunal for England and Wales
 Helena Kennedy, Baroness Kennedy of The Shaws QC, barrister, broadcaster, and Labour member of the House of Lords.

Politics and government
 Simba Makoni, Zimbabwean politician, former Minister of Finance and Economic Development (2000–2002)
 Neo Masisi, First Lady of Botswana
 Margot Parker, UK Independence Party MEP
 Andy Reed OBE, former Labour Party MP for Loughborough
 Dean Russell, British Conservative Party Politician, MP for Watford
 Angela Smith, former British Labour Party politician MP for Basildon
 Sir Peter Soulsby, MP, British Labour Party politician and Mayor of Leicester
 David Taylor, British Labour Party politician, MP for North West Leicestershire
 Claudia Webbe, British politician, MP for Leicester East

Sport
 MS Dhoni, Indian Cricketer and only captain in the world who has won 3 ICC trophies ( 2007 T20 world cup, 2011 Cricket World Cup, 2013 ICC Champions Trophy)
 Harry Ellis, England Rugby Union international
 Eddie the Eagle, ski jumper
 Kim Joo-Sung, Korean international footballer
 Lewis Moody MBE, England rugby union captain
 Geordan Murphy, Ireland rugby union international, director of rugby for Leicester Tigers
 Park Ji-sung, Korean International footballer
 Budge Pountney, Scotland rugby union international, director of rugby for Northampton Saints
 Emma Twigg, olympic Rower for New Zealand

See also
 Armorial of UK universities
 List of universities in the UK
 Post-1992 universities

Notes

References

External links

 Official website
 De Montfort Students' Union – Official website
 De Montfort University archives

 
Educational institutions established in 1992
Universities UK
1992 establishments in England